The Waterfront Blues Festival is an annual event in Portland, Oregon, United States featuring four days of performances by blues musicians. The festival started in 1988 and takes place in Tom McCall Waterfront Park, along the west bank of the Willamette River in downtown Portland.

History

The festival began in 1987 as the Rose City Blues Festival, sponsored by the Cascade Blues Association, to benefit the Burnside Community Council's projects for the homeless. The FM community radio station KBOO has broadcast performances from the event, throughout the festival's history. The following year, Oregon Food Share (predecessor of the Oregon Food Bank) became the beneficiary of the Rose City Blues Festival. In 1991, the name was changed to the Waterfront Blues Festival.

The festival celebrated its twentieth anniversary in 2007, earning the Rose City Award from the Portland Oregon Visitors Association and an official U.S. Post Office postmark commemorating the festival.

There was no festival in 2020 as a result of the COVID-19 pandemic. The 2021 festival was held at Zidell Yards, but 2022 saw the festival return to its usual location at Tom McCall Waterfront Park.

Art 

Every year there is a new poster for the Waterfront Blues Festival. The artist is Gary Houston, who has been making the iconic poster art for the festival for eighteen years

See also

List of blues festivals 
 Mt. Hood Jazz Festival

References

External links

 

 

1988 establishments in Oregon
Annual events in Portland, Oregon
Blues festivals in the United States
Folk festivals in the United States
Festivals in Portland, Oregon
Music festivals established in 1988
Tom McCall Waterfront Park
Music festivals in Oregon